POLRMT is a symbol of RNA polymerase mitochondrial
It is a DNA-directed RNA polymerase, mitochondrial is an enzyme that in humans is encoded by the POLRMT gene.

Function 

This gene encodes a mitochondrial DNA-directed RNA polymerase. The gene product is responsible for mitochondrial gene expression as well as for providing RNA primers for initiation of replication of the mitochondrial genome. Although this polypeptide has the same function as the three nuclear DNA-directed RNA polymerases, it is more closely related to RNA polymerases of bacteriophage (including T7 RNA polymerase), mitochondrial polymerases of lower eukaryotes as well as chloroplastic RpoT polymerases.

Structure 
The structure of the enzyme has been solved. It exhibits an overall structure similar to that of phage RNAP, but the initiation mechanism is different in that it requires initiation factors TFAM (only in mammals) and TFB2M. Elongation requires the elongation factor TEFM. The exact termination process is less understood, but MTERF1 is thought to play a role.

References

Further reading

External links 
 

EC 2.7.7